Didier Arsène Marcel Domi (born 2 May 1978) is a French former professional footballer who played as a left-back. During his prime, Domi used to be captain of Paris Saint-Germain and won multiple trophies in Greece with Olympiacos as well. Domi is now working as a technical advisor to the PSG Academy in Qatar.

Early life
Domi was born in Sarcelles, Val d'Oise, France.

Club career

Paris Saint-Germain
Domi joined Paris Saint-Germain as a trainee in 1994, and made his debut in January 1996. The following season, having only appeared once in their UEFA Cup Winners' Cup defence, he was brought in to start the first leg of the semi-final against Liverpool as PSG won 3–0, and also played 90 minutes in the final loss to Barcelona.

Having appeared in the UEFA Super Cup against Juventus the same season, the next campaign he took part in the UEFA Champions League and helped PSG win both the French Cup and French League Cup.

Newcastle United
Domi's performances earned a €6m move to Newcastle United in January 1999, but after a good start he fell out of favour and began 2001 with a return to PSG for the same fee for which they sold him. Whilst at Newcastle he played in the 1999 FA Cup Final and scored three league goals, all coming in the 1999–2000 season against Wimbledon, Coventry and rivals Sunderland.

Return to Paris and loan to Leeds United
Injury limited Domi's appearances at PSG and in 2003–04 he was loaned to Leeds United but only made a sporadic impact as they were relegated from the Premier League.

Espanyol and Olympiacos
PSG let Domi join Espanyol in summer 2004 and late in 2005–06 he finally held down a regular place, helping them to the Copa del Rey final, though he did not appear in the 4–1 win against Real Zaragoza. At the end of that season he moved on a free transfer to Olympiacos, signing a three-year deal.

New England Revolution
On 11 January 2011, Domi signed a one-year contract with the New England Revolution, and made his MLS debut on 26 March 2011 in a 2–1 win over D.C. United. The Revolution released Domi on 17 July 2011.

International career
Domi is a former French youth and Under-21 international.

After retirement
Domi currently works for beIN Sports in the Middle East.

Honours
Paris Saint-Germain
UEFA Cup Winners' Cup Finalist: 1997
French Cup: 1998
French League Cup: 1998
Trophée des Champions: 1998
UEFA Intertoto Cup: 2001

Espanyol
Copa del Rey: 2005–06 

Olympiacos
Super League Greece: 2006–07, 2007–08, 2008–09
Greek Football Cup: 2007–08, 2008–09
Greek Super Cup: 2007

References

1978 births
Living people
French Muslims
Converts to Islam
People from Sarcelles
Footballers from Val-d'Oise
Association football fullbacks
French footballers
French people of Martiniquais descent
French expatriate footballers
French expatriate sportspeople in the United States
Expatriate footballers in England
Expatriate footballers in Spain
Expatriate footballers in Greece
Expatriate soccer players in the United States
Paris Saint-Germain F.C. players
Newcastle United F.C. players
Leeds United F.C. players
RCD Espanyol footballers
Olympiacos F.C. players
New England Revolution players
Ligue 1 players
Premier League players
La Liga players
Super League Greece players
Major League Soccer players
FA Cup Final players